Pierre Samson (born 1958) is a Canadian writer. He was born in Montreal, Quebec and settled in Toronto, Ontario in 1995 where he wrote his first novel Messie de Belém. He returned to Montreal and published a second novel entitled Un garçon de compagnie (A boy of Company). All his novels have been published by Editions Les Herbes Rouges.

With Richard Blaimert, he is the screenwriter of the Radio-Canada television show Cover Girl (2005). He is a regular contributor to Montreal newspaper Le Devoir.

Works 
 Messie de Belém, 1995, novel
 Un garçon de compagnie, Les Herbes rouges, 1997, novel
 Il était une fois une ville, Les Herbes rouges, 1999 novel
 Alibi, Leméac, 2001, essay
 Catastrophes, Les Herbes rouges, 2007, novel
 Arabaseques, Les Herbes rouges, 2010, novel
 Lettres crues : Théâtre épistolaire de la littérature à l'époque des médias sociaux, L'Ouvroir, 2012, letters
 La maison des pluies, Les Herbes rouges, 2012, novel
 L'œil de cuivre, Les Herbes rouges, 2014, novel

Honours 
 1998 – Governor General's Awards, finalist for Un garçon de compagnie
 2000 – Governor General's Awards, finalist for Il était une fois une ville
 2001 – The academy's prize for Il était une fois une ville
 2008 – Prix littéraire des collégiens (College Literary Award) for Catastrophes
 2013 – Grand Prix du livre de Montréal (Montreal Grand Prize for books) for La maison des pluies

References

External links
 Pierre Samson profile at Les Herbes Rouges

1958 births
Canadian male screenwriters
French Quebecers
Writers from Montreal
Canadian LGBT screenwriters
Canadian gay writers
Living people
20th-century Canadian novelists
21st-century Canadian novelists
Canadian male novelists
Canadian novelists in French
Canadian LGBT novelists
Canadian screenwriters in French
21st-century Canadian screenwriters
21st-century Canadian male writers
Gay screenwriters
Gay novelists
21st-century Canadian LGBT people
20th-century Canadian LGBT people